Belle al Bar is a 1994 Italian comedy film directed, written and starred by Alessandro Benvenuti. It won the 1995 Silver Ribbon for best script.

Premise 
Leo is an obsessive art restorer in an unhappy marriage. While at work away from home, he collapses and is aided by a beautiful woman. He awakens to find the person who took care of him was his cousin Giulio, now a transgender prostitute named Giulia. As the two reconnect, Giulia confesses that she has always been in love with Leo, while Leo begins falling for Giulia.

Cast 
 Alessandro Benvenuti: Leo
 Eva Robin's: Giulia/Giulio
 Assumpta Serna: Simona
 Andrea Brambilla: Guido
 Pietro Ghislandi: Portiere di albergo

References

External links

1994 films
Italian comedy films
1994 comedy films
Italian LGBT-related films
Films directed by Alessandro Benvenuti
1994 LGBT-related films
LGBT-related comedy films
1990s Italian-language films

Incest in film
1990s Italian films